Garra culiciphaga, the red stripe barb, is a species of freshwater fish in the  family Cyprinidae. It lives in rivers in Syria and Turkey. It has a restricted range, but is not considered to be under threat.

References

Garra
Fish described in 1927
Taxa named by Jacques Pellegrin
Taxonomy articles created by Polbot